The Peace Race Juniors, officially known as the Course de la Paix Juniors, is a junior (ages 17-18) multi-day cycling race held annually in the Czech Republic. It is part of the UCI Junior Nations' Cup, and is the junior version of the Peace Race, which was contested between 1948 and 2006.

Winners
Source:

References

External links

Cycle races in the Czech Republic
Recurring sporting events established in 1965
1965 establishments in Czechoslovakia